Marl Young (January 29, 1917 – 29 April 2009) was an American musician and arranger who helped with the merger of the all-black and all-white musicians unions in Los Angeles in the early 1950s. He later became the first black music director of a major network television series, Here's Lucy, starring Lucille Ball.

Biography 
Young was born in Bluefield, Virginia, spending the first seven years of his life there before moving to Chicago, Illinois, with his family. He had begun paying piano by the age of six. 

1n 1947 he went to Los Angeles, California, where he became involved with the black musicians union and in the early 1950s was instrumental in the merging of the all-black and all-white musicians unions in Los Angeles. Steven Isoardi describes him as "one of the key figures in moving from segregated unions into an integrated American Federation of Musicians".

After first connecting with Lucille Ball and Desilu Productions in 1958, Young went on to become the first black musical director of a major network television series, Here's Lucy, and his working relationship with Ball would span 16 years.

Young, who had prostate cancer, died in Los Angeles at the age of 92.

See also 
 West Coast jazz

Further reading 
 Steven Isoardi,  Central Avenue Sounds: Jazz in Los Angeles, University of California Press, 1998.

References

External links
Interview of Marl Young, Center for Oral History Research, UCLA Library Special Collections, University of California, Los Angeles

1917 births
2009 deaths
20th-century African-American musicians
20th-century American musicians
21st-century African-American people
People from Bluefield, Virginia